Una Década is a compilation album by Panamanian musician Rubén Blades. It was released on 1 April 2003 by Columbia Records and Sony Norte. The album is a commemoration of Blades' decade at Sony Music from 1991 with Caminando to Mundo in 2002. At the 45th Grammy Awards, the album won Best World Music Album and also received a Latin Grammy Award nomination for Album of the Year.

Una Década features songs mostly written by Blades himself, taken from the albums Caminando, Amor y Control, Tras La Tormenta, La Rosa de los Vientos, Tiempos, and Mundo. The album includes two singles, a radio edit of "Estampa", and "Vida".

Critical reception 

Evan C. Gutiérrez on AllMusic said that "the common thread throughout is the brilliant musicianship and lyrical excellence that has always set Blades apart from his fellow salseros". Gutiérrez noted Blades' progression from "a fiery, visceral young talent to a sophisticated and masterful musician's musician", and stated, "this is one decade in the history of salsa that ensures Blades' place for decades to come".

Track listing

References 

2003 compilation albums
Columbia Records compilation albums
Rubén Blades albums
Epic Records compilation albums
Albums produced by Willie Colón